Jobos Beach or Playa Jobos is a beach facing the Atlantic Ocean located on the PR-466 street of Isabela in the northwest of Puerto Rico. While popular, the beach is dangerous and signs warning tourists of dangerous currents were installed in early 2021.

Jobos Beach is known as a world-class surf spot and a good place to party. In February 2013, the beach hosted the Rip Curl Pro, a world tour surfing competition. Jobos is also a popular beach for windsurfing.

The area near Jobos Beach suffered heavy damage from Hurricane Maria on September 20, 2017.

Jobos Beach in Isabela is considered a dangerous beach.

Gallery

References

Beaches of Puerto Rico
Isabela, Puerto Rico